Dersch is a surname. Notable people with the surname include:

 Doug Dersch (born 1946), Canadian football player
 Hans Dersch (born 1967), American swimmer
 Otto Dersch, German mathematician

See also
 R v Dersch, Canadian court case